Tenor is an online GIF search engine and database owned by Google. Its main product is the GIF Keyboard, which is available on Android, iOS, and macOS.

History 
The company was founded by entrepreneurs David Macintosh, Erick Hachenburg and Frank Nawabi in February 2014 as Riffsy. Tenor was funded by Redpoint Ventures, Menlo Ventures, Cowboy Ventures and Tenaya Capital.

On March 27, 2018, Tenor was acquired by Google. The company will continue to operate as a standalone brand.

Partnerships 
Tenor is available in numerous keyboards and messaging apps.

On April 25, 2017, Tenor introduced an app that makes GIFs available in MacBook Pro's Touch Bar. Users can scroll through GIFs and tap to copy it to the clipboard.

On September 7, 2017, Tenor announced SDK for Unity and Apple's ARKit. It allows developers to integrate GIFs into augmented reality apps and games.

Censorship 
On November 6, 2017, in response to users having utilized Tenor and similar services to distribute GIFs with content that is illegal under local laws, the Indonesian Ministry of Communication and Informatics threatened to block WhatsApp. The regulator acknowledged that despite being from third-party providers, WhatsApp was wholly responsible for allowing the content to be disseminated to users, because the feature was part of their platform. The next day, Tenor was blocked in the country. The threats were later dropped.

References

External links 
 

GIF hosting websites
2018 mergers and acquisitions
Google acquisitions
American search engines
American companies established in 2014
Internet properties established in 2014
Companies based in San Francisco